Mooyah (stylized as MOOYAH) is an American fast casual restaurant chain headquartered in Plano, Texas. The chain reached over 100 locations in 20 U.S. states and nine countries in 2016 in North America and the Middle East. They specialize in hamburgers, french fries, and shakes. They are known for their beef hamburgers which use Angus beef and their French-fries.

History
Mooyah was founded by American veterans Rich Hicks and Todd Istre in 2007 in Plano, where the first MOOYAH restaurant was opened on Independence Parkway. In 2013, the first international restaurant opened in Dubai, United Arab Emirates and was the 50th location opened. In 2016, its 100th location opened in Tuscaloosa, Alabama.

In May 2017, MOOYAH was sold to private equity firms Gala Capital Partners LLC and Balmoral Funds LLC for an undisclosed amount.

Awards and recognition
MOOYAH was ranked on Fast Casual's Top Movers and Shakers list for eight consecutive years since 2009 and is ranked 2nd in Best Fast Casual Restaurant Franchise Company on Franchiserankings.com, a website that ranks franchises by their success. In 2017, Mooyah was named to Entrepreneur’s Franchise 500 list, 60th in Best Franchises Company USA, and Franchise Times Fast & Serious list that ranks the smartest-growing brands.

See also
 List of franchises
 List of restaurant chains in the United States

References

2007 establishments in Texas
Fast casual restaurants
Fast-food chains of the United States
Fast-food hamburger restaurants
Restaurant chains in the United States
Restaurants established in 2007
Companies based in Plano, Texas